Ambalavanar Neminathan ( Ampalavāṇar Nēminātaṉ; 30 May 1961 – 25 August 2002; commonly known by the nom de guerre Raju) was a leading member of the Liberation Tigers of Tamil Eelam (LTTE), a separatist Tamil militant organisation in Sri Lanka.

Neminathan was born on 30 May 1961. He was from Erlalai South near Chunnakam, Jaffna District.

Neminathan joined the LTTE after the Black July riots of 1983, taking on the nom de guerre Raju. Raju served as the head of the LTTE's Engineering Corps. He was said to be close to LTTE leader V. Prabhakaran. He was special commander of the Leopard Commandos, an infantry unit, and chief technical officer in the Kittu Regiment, the LTTE's artillery unit which Raju helped create. Raju was the target of a number of covert assassination attempts by the Sri Lankan military.

After developing cancer Raju was taken from Vanni to Malaysia by boat. He died on 25 August 2002 in Malaysia. He was posthumously promoted to Colonel.

References

External links
 
 
 

1961 births
2002 deaths
Liberation Tigers of Tamil Eelam members
People from Northern Province, Sri Lanka
Sri Lankan Tamil rebels